The 1996 Summer Olympics—based in Atlanta, Georgia, United States—marked the first time that women participated in the Olympic association football tournament. The tournament featured eight women's national teams from four continental confederations. The teams were drawn into two groups of four and each group played a round-robin tournament (which was held in Miami, Orlando, Birmingham and Washington, D.C.). At the end of the group stage, the top two teams advanced to the knockout stage (which was held at Sanford Stadium in Athens, Georgia), beginning with the semi-finals and culminating with the gold medal match on August 1, 1996.

The United States became the inaugural champion after a 2–1 victory against China in the gold medal game.

Competition schedule

Qualification

The qualification system for the inaugural women's football tournament was based on the results of the 1995 FIFA World Cup. Seven best teams and the host nation were qualified for the tournament. As the third-ranked United States team was already qualified as the host, its spot was passed down to the eighth-ranked team, Japan. England was ranked seventh, but due to it not being an IOC member, its spot was passed down to the ninth-ranked Brazil.

Asia (AFC)

South America (CONMEBOL)

Europe (UEFA)

North and Central America (CONCACAF)
 Host nation

Venues
The tournament was held in five venues across five cities:
Sanford Stadium, Athens
Legion Field, Birmingham
Orange Bowl, Miami
Citrus Bowl, Orlando
Robert F. Kennedy Memorial Stadium, Washington, D.C.

Squads

Match officials

Group stage

Group E

Group F

Knockout stage

Semi-finals

Bronze medal match

Gold medal match

Statistics

Goalscorers

Assists

FIFA Fair Play Award
 Winner: 

The United States won the FIFA Fair Play Award, given to the team with the best record of fair play during the tournament.

Tournament ranking

References

External links
Olympic Football Tournaments Atlanta 1996 - Women, FIFA.com
RSSSF Summary
FIFA Technical Report (Part 1), (Part 2), (Part 3) and (Part 4)

 
1996
Oly
1996
Sports in Athens, Georgia